Nazish Jahangir is a Pakistani television actress. She is known for her role as Zoya in Thays, Faiza in Tohmat, Nimra in Kam Zarf and Shameela in Kahin Deep Jaley. Jahangir has been nominated as a Best Emerging Talent in TV at Lux Style Awards.  Other than acting, she is known for her work as a mental health awareness activist. Jahangir has also been on the cover of a number of leading magazines in Pakistan.

Early life and career 
Born and raised in Islamabad, she initially graduated in fine arts and fashion designing, and after being encouraged by Jamal Shah, her professor, renowned artist and founder of Hunerkada, to pursue a career in performing arts, Jahangir moved to Karachi and started doing commercial theatre with Anwar Maqsood in 2015.

She made her TV debut in 2017 with Bharosa. Jahangir has also appeared in Kahin Deep Jaley, Alif, Allah Aur Insaan, Tohmat, Thays, Kam Zardari, Beparwah, Dard Rukta Nahi, Ghamandi, Inaam-e-Mohabbat, Berukhi, Teri Behisi, Saraab and Meray Mohsin.

In 2020, the actress revealed that she has been battling PTSD for the last 10 years, and continues to struggle with mental health issues.

In 2022, Jahangir made her film debut opposite Sami Khan with movie Lafengay.

Television

Awards and nominations

References

External links 
 

Living people
Pakistani television actresses
21st-century Pakistani actresses
1994 births